Android One is a family of third-party Android smartphones promoted by Google. In comparison to many third-party Android devices, which ship with a manufacturer's customized user interface and bundled apps, these devices run near-stock versions of Android with limited modifications, and a focus on Google services (although they may still feature software enhancements to support the features of included hardware, such as cameras). Devices that run Android One receive OS updates for at least two years after their release, and security patches for at least three years.

The Android One program began in 2014, and was first positioned as a reference platform for low-end devices targeting emerging markets such as India. A goal of the program was to accelerate the availability of newer versions of Android on such devices. In the years that followed, the Android One program expanded to target more territories and global releases, and to include mid-range and high-end devices as well. As of December 2018, there were over 100 Android One smartphone models.

Android One has been considered a successor to the former Google Play Edition and Nexus programs, which similarly featured third-party devices co-developed or vetted by Google, with stock Android and quicker releases of updates. The Google Pixel replaced Nexus as a first-party brand of flagship Android devices manufactured by Google; although they do run a stock Android interface, they still contain exclusive software features that are not always made available to the stock Android source code or third-party devices.

History 
Android One was started by Sundar Pichai, former product chief and current CEO of Google. Before Android One, it often took at least a year before the latest Android update arrived on non-Google devices. The project was targeted at the Indian market for low-tier devices. Pichai said that the initial set of devices shared common hardware because they were based on the reference platform, but an increasing range of devices were to be launched in the future. Security and system updates were handled by Google for the first set of Android One devices, which featured MediaTek's quad-core MT6582 Mobile System-on-Chip (Mobile SoC).

In 2014, Android One phones initially rolled out in India, Pakistan, Bangladesh, Nepal, Indonesia, the Philippines, Sri Lanka, Myanmar and other South Asian countries. The first Android One smartphones were by the Indian brands Micromax, Spice and Karbonn in September 2014, the second generation Android One smartphones were by Indonesia brands Mito Impact, Evercoss One X, Nexian journey in February 2015 and the first Android One preinstalled with Android 5.0 Lollipop. Other manufacturers including QMobile have launched an Android One device named QMobile A1, on July 6, 2015, in Pakistan. Android One launched in Nigeria in August 2015 with the Infinix Hot 2 X510 (1 and 2 GB RAM version) and became the first Android One in Africa. Infinix Hot 2 X510 was also exported to other African countries such as Egypt, Ghana, Ivory Coast, Morocco, Kenya, Cameroon, Uganda, and also Asian countries such as United Arab Emirates, Pakistan and Indonesia (2 GB RAM version only). Other manufactures are to follow gradually.

In 2016, SoftBank announced they would be the first carrier in Japan to introduce an Android One phone in the country, namely the Sharp 507SH which was released in late July 2016.

On May 25, 2017, Turkish smartphone brand "General Mobile" released the next addition to their fully committed portfolio of Android One phones, the GM 6. SoftBank soon followed by introducing the Sharp X1 in Japan through its subsidiary telecommunications company, Y!Mobile, on June 30.

On September 5, 2017, Android One and Xiaomi jointly announced the Xiaomi Mi A1 as the first Android One device to be released globally in over 36 markets. In September 2017, MVNO Google Fi introduced the first Android One device available in the U.S. with the Android One Moto X4. In November 2017, Android One entered the German market with HTC with the U11 Life.

At the end of November 2017, SoftBank announced the addition of four new devices to its Android One lineup with Y!Mobile: the X2 (HTC), X3 (Kyocera), S3 (Sharp), and S4 (Kyocera).

In February 2018, HMD Global, the maker of Nokia smartphones, announced that it had joined the Android One program. Nokia 6.1, Nokia 7 Plus, and Nokia 8 Sirocco were among the first batch of Android One phones from HMD.

In 2020, Xiaomi discontinued its only Android One lineup, the Xiaomi Mi A series, ending with the Xiaomi Mi A3.

Features 

Devices are approved by Google, and original equipment manufacturers (OEMs) agree to these requirements:

 Has Android OS updates for two years.
 Has regular security patch updates for three years.
 Has stock Android UI.
 Google services intact.

Android One has these features:

 Minimal amount of bloatware.
 Android One phones prioritize background activity for the most important apps to reduce power usage. In addition, its lower memory footprint is also suited for entry-level smartphones with 3 GB of RAM or less, as well as those with slower processors.
 "Google Search Bar" widget on the home screen is unremovable. However a user can change its position and theme.

OS and security updates 

Concerning Android operating system (OS) and security updates the official Android One entry page says (in the fine print at the end of it): "Confirm exact duration of support for phones in your territory with smartphone manufacturer. Monthly security updates to be supported for at least three years after initial phone release."

A February 22, 2018, Google blog article says: "Faster access to Android OS updates for two years, including the latest AI innovations from Google; Amongst the most secure devices in the ecosystem with regular security updates for three years and Google Play Protect built in".

In December 2018 Google stated: "We confirm that our promise to provide 2 years of updates on Android One devices still stands and our website design does not impact the promise of this program."

Products by year of announcement or release 
Android One continues to expand its line of smartphones and geographic availability through OEM and carrier partnerships.

Countries of release are likely to expand beyond the initial countries and regions listed below.

2021

2020

2019

2018

2017

2016

2015 

The Snapdragon 410 devices are rebrands of the Longcheer L8150, which is based on the Qualcomm Seed reference design, explaining their similarities. A direct competitor is the Wileyfox Swift, which is available worldwide, officially supported by Wileyfox with recent Android versions and community supported with LineageOS ROMs.

2014

References

External links 
 

Android (operating system)
Android (operating system) devices